The 2016–17 season was Tottenham Hotspur's 25th season in the Premier League and 39th successive season in the top division of the English football league system. Along with the Premier League, the club competed in the FA Cup, League Cup and the Champions League. Upon finishing 3rd in the group stage of the Champions League they then qualified and entered into knock-out stage of the Europa League.

They played their home domestic fixtures at White Hart Lane and their home European fixtures at Wembley Stadium. The season covers the period from 1 July 2016 to 30 June 2017.

It was the club's final season at White Hart Lane before it was demolished to make way for the new stadium. Tottenham went the season unbeaten at their old stadium in all competitions: it was the first time they had been unbeaten at home in a league campaign since the 1964–65 season. In winning their final fourteen home league matches, they equalled the club record set over the final nine games of 1986–87 and the first five of 1987–88.

Squad

First-team squad
Age listed below are accurate as of 21 May 2017
{| class="wikitable" style="text-align:center; width:80%"
|-
! style="background:#000080; color:white; text-align:center;"| Squad no.
! style="background:#000080; color:white; text-align:center;"| Name
! style="background:#000080; color:white; text-align:center;"| Nationality
! style="background:#000080; color:white; text-align:center;"| Position(s)
! style="background:#000080; color:white; text-align:center;"| Date of Birth (age)
|-
! colspan="5" style="background:#dcdcdc; text-align:center;"| Goalkeepers
|-
| 1
| Hugo Lloris (C)
| 
| GK
| 
|-
| 13
| Michel Vorm
| 
| GK
| 
|-
| 30
| Pau López
| 
| GK
| 
|-

! colspan="5" style="background:#dcdcdc; text-align:center;"| Defenders
|-
| 2
| Kyle Walker
| 
| RB / RWB
| 
|-
| 3
| Danny Rose
| 
| LB / LWB
| 
|-
| 4
| Toby Alderweireld
| 
| CB / RB
| 
|-
| 5
| Jan Vertonghen (2nd VC)| 
| CB / LB
| 
|-
| 16
| Kieran Trippier
| 
| RB / RWB
| 
|-
| 27
| Kevin Wimmer
| 
| CB / LB
| 
|-
| 33
| Ben Davies
| 
| LB / CB
| 
|-
| 38
| Cameron Carter-Vickers
| 
| CB / RB
| 
|-
! colspan="5" style="background:#dcdcdc; text-align:center;"| Midfielders
|-
| 11
| Erik Lamela
| 
| RW / LW
| 
|-
| 12
| Victor Wanyama
| 
| DM / CM
| 
|-
| 14
| Georges-Kévin Nkoudou
| 
| LW / RW
| 
|-
| 15
| Eric Dier
| 
| DM / CB / RB
| 
|-
| 17
| Moussa Sissoko
| 
| CM / DM / RM
| 
|-
| 19
| Mousa Dembélé
| 
| CM / DM
| 
|-
| 20
| Dele Alli
| 
| CM / AM
| 
|-
| 23
| Christian Eriksen
| 
| AM / SS
| 
|-
| 25
| Josh Onomah
| 
| AM / SS
| 
|-
| 29
| Harry Winks
| 
| CM / DM
| 
|-
! colspan="12" style="background:#dcdcdc; text-align:center;"| Strikers
|-
| 7
| Son Heung-min
| 
| FW / LW / RW / SS
| 
|-
| 9
| Vincent Janssen
| 
| FW
| 
|-
| 10
| Harry Kane (1st VC)| 
| FW / SS
| 
|-
|}

Transfers

Loans in

Loans out

Transfers in

Transfers out

Overall transfer activity

Spending
Summer:  £67,400,000

Winter:  £0

Total:  £67,400,000

Income
Summer:  £39,000,000

Winter:  £20,500,000

Total:  £59,500,000

Expenditure
Summer:  £28,400,000

Winter:  £20,500,000

Total:  £7,900,000

Friendlies

Pre-season
On 1 March 2016, it was announced that Tottenham would participate in the Australia edition of the 2016 International Champions Cup. On 24 June, it was announced on the Tottenham Hotspur website that they would also play against Inter Milan in Norway.

Post-season
On 8 May 2017, Spurs confirmed a return to Hong Kong to play an exhibition match against Kitchee SC, which closed Spurs' season.

Competitions

Overall

Overview

{| class="wikitable" style="text-align: center"
|-
!rowspan=2|Competition
!colspan=8|Record
|-
!
!
!
!
!
!
!
!
|-
| Premier League

|-
| FA Cup

|-
| EFL Cup

|-
| Champions League

|-
| Europa League

|-
! Total

Premier League

League table

Results summary

Results by matchday

Matches
On 15 June 2016, the fixtures for the forthcoming season were announced.

FA Cup

EFL Cup

UEFA Champions League

Group stage

UEFA Europa League

Knockout phase

Round of 32

Statistics

Appearances

Goal scorers
Includes all competitive matches.

 Hat-tricks 

Own goals

Clean sheetsThe list is sorted by squad number when total clean sheets are equal.''

References

Tottenham Hotspur
Tottenham Hotspur F.C. seasons
Tottenham Hotspur
Tottenham Hotspur